The 1966 Australian Tourist Trophy was a motor race staged at the Longford Circuit in Tasmania, Australia on 7 March 1966. It was the tenth annual Australian Tourist Trophy race. The race was open to sports cars as defined by the Confederation of Australian Motor Sport (CAMS) in its Appendix C regulations, and it was recognized by CAMS as the Australian championship for sports cars. It was won by Frank Matich driving an Elfin 400 Traco Oldsmobile.

Results

Race statistics:
 Race distance: 23 laps – 103½ miles
 Pole position: Frank Matich
 Number of starters: 19
 Number of finishers: not yet ascertained
 Fastest lap: Frank Matich - 2:28.7
 First Tasmanian: Kerry Cox (Paramount Jaguar)

References

External links
 Images from 1966 Longford, www.oldracephotos.com

Australian Tourist Trophy
Tourist Trophy
Motorsport in Tasmania